The 1966 Grand Prix motorcycle racing season was the 18th F.I.M. Road Racing World Championship Grand Prix season. The season consisted of twelve Grand Prix races in six classes: 500cc, 350cc, 250cc, 125cc, 50cc and Sidecars 500cc. It began on 8 May, with Spanish Grand Prix and ended with Japanese Grand Prix on 17 October.

Season summary
Honda stepped up their racing program with a new four-cylinder 500cc bike, as well as bikes in the four smaller classes. Despite Honda's increased efforts, Suzuki would claim the 50cc title with Hans-Georg Anscheidt winning the championship from Honda's Luigi Taveri at the last race of the season in Japan. Yamaha would battle Honda all season for the 125 crown, each factory taking five wins, with Honda's Taveri taking the title from Yamaha's Bill Ivy.

Mike Hailwood, having left the MV Agusta team to ride for Honda, stormed to the 250 crown, winning the first eight races of the season, as Phil Read struggled with Yamaha's new v-four race bike. Hailwood would make it a double when he also claimed the 350 class ahead of MV Agusta's Giacomo Agostini. Honda's plan was for Jim Redman to lead their 500 class campaign before he retired. All started well with Redman winning the first two races of the year however, Honda's hopes were dashed when he crashed in the rain in Belgium and broke his wrist. This gave Agostini the championship lead, which he held despite Hailwood taking three of the last six races. Honda took some consolation by winning all five constructor's titles for a clean sweep.

1966 Grand Prix season calendar

Standings

Scoring system
Points were awarded to the top six finishers in each race.  Only the best of four were counted on 50cc championships, best of five in 350cc and 500cc championships, best of six in 125cc and 250cc championships, while in the Sidecars, only the best of three races were counted.

500cc final standings

350cc Standings

250cc Standings

125cc Standings

50cc Standings

References
 Büla, Maurice & Schertenleib, Jean-Claude (2001). Continental Circus 1949-2000. Chronosports S.A. 

Grand Prix motorcycle racing seasons
Grand Prix motorcycle racing season